Kjetil Trøan(IMDb) was one of the sound designers on the 2007 Academy Award winner "The Danish Poet". Works as a freelance sounddesigner. He and the others on the Danish Poet team was the first Norwegians to win an Oscar in over 50 years.

From http://www.ba-avis.no/eceRedirect?articleId=77456&pubId=1498

Layered and mixed the sound  on Oscar - winner
 By Morten Reiertsen 
Kjetil Trøan (30) did the sound postproduction for  Norways first Oscar - winner in 50 year.  Kjetil Trøan has along with Håkon Lammetun and Frode Løes Hvatum in Lydhodene AS layered and mixed the sound on the Norwegian Oscar - winner, "The Danish poet" by Torill Kove. He met both the director and Liv Ullmann during recording and in post. – It was a beyond and above moment for me working on "The Danish Poet", Trøan replied. Read additional about this in the paperissue and in PDFedition. This was publiced in http://www.ba-avis.no a norwegian paper, at 27.02.2007 - 22:15Updated28.02.2007 - 12:34 and is translated to english.

 In Norwegian.

References 

He was also the chief of sound department and supervising sound editor and re-recording mixer on the documentary "Ylvingen", "Pappa kom hem" in 2008.

In 2009 he will be chief of sound in at least two cinema films, Kill Buljo 2 and 3, and also part of the sound department on the 3rd season of Himmelblå in NRK.

Articles:
The Soundmaker of Zombies
Layered sound on Oscar winner

1976 births
Living people